The list of ship decommissionings in 1986 includes a chronological list of all ships decommissioned in 1986.


See also

References 

1986
 Ship decommissionings
Ship